Ernest Butler (17 June 1896–1979) was an English footballer who played in the Football League for Durham City, Hartlepools United and Queens Park Rangers.

References

1896 births
1969 deaths
English footballers
Association football forwards
English Football League players
Scunthorpe United F.C. players
Ebbw Vale F.C. players
Queens Park Rangers F.C. players
Hartlepool United F.C. players
Durham City A.F.C. players